Gangsta Gangsta may refer to:

"Gangsta Gangsta" (N.W.A song), 1988
"Gangsta Gangsta", a song by Lil' Scrappy from Bred 2 Die, Born 2 Live, 2006
"Gangsta Gangsta" (Degrassi: The Next Generation), a television episode

See also
"Gangster, Gangster", a 2008 song by Styles P from Super Gangster (Extraordinary Gentleman)